Metamorphosis ( "Breaking Out Of The Shell" in Chinese) is a Singaporean Chinese action thriller drama which is being telecast on Singapore's free-to-air channel, MediaCorp TV Channel 8. It made its debut on 18 September 2007, screening at 9 PM every night on weekdays. The serial consists of 20 episodes. In the last few episodes, the serial recorded a viewership rate of over 1 million and was awarded the "Best Drama Series Award" in the Star Awards 2007. Yvonne Lim also received the "Best Actress Award" in the same event.

Cast

Main Cast

Supporting Cast

Special Appearances

Awards and nominations

Viewership

Reception
The serial generated largely positive reviews from critics and recorded a viewership of over a million in its final episodes.

See also
List of programmes broadcast by Mediacorp Channel 8
Breaking out of Shell Theme Song

External links
Official Website (English Edition)
Official Website (Chinese Edition)

Singapore Chinese dramas
2007 Singaporean television series debuts
2007 Singaporean television series endings
Channel 8 (Singapore) original programming